Spriggans are small fairy-like creatures.

Spriggan may also refer to:

 Spriggan (manga), a manga series originally published from 1989 to 1996 and adapted into an animated film in 1998.
 Spriggan Powered, Japan-exclusive video game, third title from the Seirei Senshi Spriggan series.
 Sprigg, a character from Chrono Cross, referred to in the Japanese version as "Spriggan"
 9M133 Kornet, a Russian anti-tank missile with the NATO codename "Spriggan"
 Emperor Spriggan, AKA Zeref in the manga Fairy Tail